Tales from the Gimli Hospital is a 1988 film directed by Guy Maddin. His feature film debut, it was his second film after the short The Dead Father. Tales from the Gimli Hospital was shot in black and white on 16 mm film and stars Kyle McCulloch as Einar, a lonely fisherman who contracts smallpox and begins to compete with another patient, Gunnar (played by Michael Gottli) for the attention of the young nurses.

Maddin had himself endured a recent period of male rivalry and noticed that he found himself "quite often forgetting the object of jealousy" and instead becoming "possessive of my rival." The film was originally titled Gimli Saga after the amateur history book produced locally by various Icelandic members of the community of Gimli (Maddin himself is Icelandic by ancestry). Maddin's aunt Lil had recently retired from hairdressing, and allowed Maddin to use her beauty salon (also Maddin's childhood home) as a makeshift film studio (Lil appears in the film briefly as a "bedside vigil-sitter in one quick shot [taken] just a couple of days before she died" at the age of 85). After Maddin's mother sold the house/studio, Maddin completed the remaining shots of the film at various locations, including his own home, over a period of eighteen months. Maddin received a grant from the Manitoba Arts Council for $20,000 and often cites that figure as the film's budget, although also estimates the actual budget between $14,000 and $30,000.

Plot
The film opens on two young children whose mother is dying in the present-day Gimli, Manitoba hospital. During a visit to see her, the children's Icelandic grandmother launches into the grim and convoluted tale of Einar the Lonely, a patient in a far-distant-past version of the same hospital—in "a Gimli we no longer know," as the grandmother puts it. The rest of the film consists of Einar's story.

Einar (Kyle McCulloch) succumbs to a smallpox epidemic and is admitted to the Gimli hospital for treatment, where he meets his neighbor Gunnar (Michael Gottli). While both are at first pleased to have a friend nearby in their time of illness, the two men soon begin competing for the attentions and affections of the hospital's beautiful young nurses. Gunnar outperforms Einar in this regard, given his storytelling abilities and his skill at carving birch bark into the shape of fish. The hospital is built above a stable (for heat from the animals) and director Maddin appears in a cameo as a surgeon who operates while patients are told to observe a badly-acted puppet show as a sort of anesthesia.

Gunnar borrows Einar's fish-carving shears and recognizes the decorated pair of shears as uncannily similar to those he buried with his wife Snjófridur (Angela Heck). Gunnar recalls the story of their courtship and her death from smallpox she contracted from Gunnar. His aboriginal friend, despite Gunnar's protests, then laid her body to rest in the traditional aboriginal manner, on a raised platform with tokens and gifts including the shears. Einar relates to Gunnar the story of how he came to possess the shears: while wandering in the dark one night he discovered the corpse of a beautiful woman on a raised burial platform (who he now realizes must have been Snjófridur). Einar stole the tokens buried with her and had sex with her corpse.

Gunnar is furious but too weak to take immediate revenge on Einar, and coincidentally a fire breaks out on the hospital roof. The Icelanders put out the fire by pouring milk over it, which then drips down into Gunnar's face and blinds him. A blackfaced minstrel is buried and Einar contemplates further destroying Gunnar through carving him up with the selfsame shears stolen from his wife's corpse. Einar and Gunnar exit the hospital and wander around feverishly. Einar observes Lord Dufferin giving a public speech. Einar hallucinates that Lord Dufferin is the mythical Fish Princess. The men end up in a field together along with a Shriners Highland Pipe Band and begin to Glima Wrestle—a traditional competition where fighters graps each other's buttocks and take turns lifting one another up until one collapses. They tear each other's clothes and claw at each other's buttocks until they bleed, then both collapse.

Einar is later back in his small shack/fish smokehouse and is visited by a recovered and no-longer-blind Gunnar and his new fiance. They happily saunter along the beach of Lake Winnipeg while Einar regards them jealously, still Einar the Lonely. The scene returns to the present-day Gimli where the children are informed that their mother has died. They ask the storytelling Amma to be their mother and she says "no" but that she will still visit "if your father lets me." They ask about heaven and she prepares to tell another story as the film ends.

Cast
 Kyle McCulloch as Einar the Lonely (and also a minstrel in blackface)
 Michael Gottli as Gunnar
 Angela Heck as Snjófridur
 Margaret Anne MacLeod as Amma
 Heather Neale	as Granddaughter
 David Neale as Grandson
 Don Hewak as John Ramsay
 Ron Eyolfson as Pastor Osbaldison / Patient (as Ronald Eyolfson)
 Chris Johnson as Lord Dufferin
 Donna Szöke as Fish Princess

Production
The film had a budget of $22,000, with most of the funding coming from the Manitoba Arts Council, and Greg Klymkiw raised $40,000 from the Winnipeg Film Group to market the film.

Release
Tales from the Gimli Hospital was famously rejected by the Toronto International Film Festival when a divided jury mistook its anachronistic style as unintentionally ill-crafted. Nevertheless, it became a cult success and established Maddin's reputation in independent film circles. The film garnered the attention of Ben Barenholtz, who had successfully distributed other cult films such as the John Waters film Pink Flamingos and David Lynch's debut feature Eraserhead. Tales from the Gimli Hospital consequently screened for a full year as a midnight movie at the Quad Theatre in New York's Greenwich Village. Maddin received a Genie Award nomination for Best Original Screenplay as well, although the script consisted of a series of Post-it notes. The film grossed $116,000 by 1992.

Along with Maddin's debut short film, The Dead Father, Tales from the Gimli Hospital was released to home video on DVD.

Critical reception

The film received generally positive reviews, with review aggregator Rotten Tomatoes reporting a 71% approval rating based on 7 reviews. Reviewers, although generally positive, also seemed perplexed by the film: Jonathan Rosenbaum commented on its "moment-to-moment invention and genuine weirdness" and Noel Murray of the Onion A.V. Club similarly noted that "[Maddin] self-consciously borrows from dozens of sources, including radio dramas, Our Gang shorts, hygiene films, school plays, stag pictures, Universal horror, ethnographic documentaries, and the indie weirdness of John Waters and David Lynch." The 1989 review in The New York Times referred to its "midnight-cult status" and lengthy run at New York's Quad Cinema, and noted that "Many bits of [the film's] seemingly surreal business supposedly draw on ancient Icelandic customs, like using oil squeezed from fish as a hair pomade, cleaning the face with straw, and sleeping under dirt blankets."

Awards and nominations
Genie Awards:
Nominated: Best Original Screenplay – Guy Maddin

References

Works cited

External links
 
 
 

1988 films
Canadian black-and-white films
English-language Canadian films
Films directed by Guy Maddin
Icelandic-language films
Gimli, Manitoba
Films set in Manitoba
1988 directorial debut films
1980s English-language films
1980s Canadian films